The second USS Tennessee (ACR-10), also referred to as "Armored Cruiser No. 10", and later renamed Memphis, was a United States Navy armored cruiser, the lead ship of her class.

She was laid down by the Cramp Shipbuilding Company of Philadelphia on 20 June 1903, launched on 3 December 1904, sponsored by Ms. Annie K. Frazier (daughter of Governor James B. Frazier of Tennessee and later the foundress of the Society of Sponsors of the United States Navy), and commissioned at the Philadelphia Navy Yard on 17 July 1906, Captain Albert Gleaves Berry in command.

Operational career
After a brief visit to Puerto Rico on the return voyage, the warships arrived back at Hampton Roads on 26 November.

Following a yard period for repairs, Tennessee left Hampton Roads on 16 April 1907 for the Jamestown Exposition, held from 7 to 11 June 1907, to commemorate the tricentennial of the founding of the first English settlement in America.

She returned home in August but departed Hampton Roads on 12 October for the Pacific, where she became flagship for the second division of the Pacific Fleet.

Tennessee then patrolled off the California coast until 24 August 1908 but suffered a boiler tube explosion on 5 June, which killed seven men, while steaming at full speed. The explosion occurred just after the rear admiral in charge of the squadron had visited on a tour of inspection; had the explosion taken place a few minutes earlier, he might have been among the casualties. Since the ship's 16 boilers were sub-divided into separate watertight compartments, the rest of the engineering section was not affected. Once repairs had been made and her tour had ended, Tennessee sailed for Samoa, arriving at Pago Pago on 23 September to resume service with the Pacific Fleet. On 15 May 1910, she arrived at Bahía Blanca to represent the United States at the centenary celebration of the independence of Argentina. On 8 November, the armored cruiser departed Portsmouth, New Hampshire, and proceeded to Charleston, South Carolina, to embark President William Howard Taft for a round trip voyage to Panama to inspect further progress on the canal. She returned to Hampton Roads on 22 November and then engaged in battle practice off the Virginia coast into February 1911. Following a Mardi Gras visit to New Orleans and a visit to New York City early in March, the ship steamed to Cuban waters for two months of operations out of Guantanamo Bay.

Placed in reserve at the Portsmouth Navy Yard on 15 June 1911, she remained on the east coast for 18 months before departing Philadelphia on 12 November 1912 for the Mediterranean. Arriving off Smyrna (now İzmir), Turkey on 1 December, she remained there protecting American citizens and property during the First Balkan War until 3 May 1913, when she headed home. After reaching Hampton Roads on the 23rd, Tennessee operated on the East Coast until entering the Atlantic Reserve Fleet at Philadelphia on 23 October. On 2 May 1914, she became receiving ship at the New York Navy Yard.

On 4 November, Tennessee arrived in Beirut, what was then Syria, to protect the Christian population there in case of attack by Syrian Muslims.

On 6 August, Tennessee sailed from New York for duty in Europe through the first half of 1915 supporting the American Relief Expedition by carrying gold bullion and other resources to assist in the extraction of American refugees from war-ravaged Europe. In August, she transported the 1st Regiment, Marine Expeditionary Force, and the Marine Artillery Battalion to Haiti. From 28 January-24 February 1916, the cruiser served as flagship of a cruiser squadron off Port-au-Prince, Haiti. In March, she embarked a group of dignitaries at Hampton Roads for a two-month, round trip cruise to Montevideo, Uruguay.

On 25 May 1916, Tennessee was renamed Memphis, honoring the city of Memphis, Tennessee, so that the name "Tennessee" could be reassigned to the new battleship .

In July 1916, under the command of Captain Edward L. Beach, Sr., the ship got underway for the Caribbean arriving at Santo Domingo on 23 July for peace-keeping patrol off the rebellion-torn Dominican Republic.

Loss
Shortly after 12:00, Memphis began to roll heavily and Captain Beach observed an unexpected heavy swell developing. Memphis and Castine both made preparations to leave the harbor and began to raise steam; Memphis expected to be able to get underway at about 16:35.

Conditions in the harbor had deteriorated badly by 15:45, when Memphis sighted an approaching  wave of yellow water stretching along the entire horizon. She began to strike the rocky harbor bottom at 16:40, damaging her propellers just as she was raising enough steam to begin moving, and her engines lost steam pressure.

At about this time, the giant wave Memphis had seen approaching over the past hour arrived; she rolled into a deep trough and was struck immediately by what proved to be three very large waves in rapid succession, the highest of them estimated by the crew to have been  in height, completely swamping her except for her highest points, and washing crewmen overboard. By 17:00, she had been driven under cliffs along the coast of the harbor and was resting on the harbor bottom. She was battered into a complete wreck in 90 minutes. Castine, meanwhile, managed to reach safer waters by getting underway and putting to sea through the large waves, although damaged by them and at times in danger of capsizing.

Memphiss casualties numbered 43 men dead or missing – 10 of them washed overboard by the waves or killed by steam as the ship's powerplant broke up, another 25 lost as they returned from shore leave in the ship's motor launch and were caught in the harbor by the huge breakers, and eight more lost in three boats wrecked after dark as they attempted to reach shore – and 204 badly injured. Due to their heroic actions during this incident, Chief Machinist's Mate George William Rud, Lieutenant Claud Ashton Jones, and Machinist Charles H. Willey were awarded the Medal of Honor.

Alternative explanations for the wreck
In his 1966 account of the incident, The Wreck of the Memphis, Captain Beachs son, Edward L. Beach Jr., ascribed her loss to an unexpected tsunami exceeding  in height, and this explanation has been carried forward by most sources discussing her loss. More recent research, however, has called this explanation into question. No record of any seismic event in the Caribbean on 29 August 1916 that could have triggered a tsunami has been found, and the rate of advance of the large wave Memphis reported – about an hour to cross the distance from the horizon to the ship – matches that of a wind-generated ocean wave (possibly a rogue wave); a tsunami, in contrast, would have covered the distance in only a few minutes. The periods of the three large waves that struck Memphis also are characteristic of large wind-generated waves rather than tsunamis.

A likely source for such large, wind-generated waves in Santo Domingo Harbor on 29 August 1916 does exist, in that three hurricanes active in the Caribbean between 12 August and 2 September 1916 passed westward just to the south. Waves generated from these storms could well have combined to create a large wave like those that struck and wrecked Memphis. Such a circumstance appears to explain the loss of the ship better than the tsunami theory. This swamped the cruiser, anchored in only  of water, and would have done so even had the ship been at full maneuvering power.

Salvage efforts

Although Memphis came to rest upright and appeared relatively undamaged above the waterline, it was apparent as early as the day after the disaster that she was not worth repairing; she was outdated by 1916, she had suffered the destruction of her propulsion plant and severe distortion of her hull structure, and her bottom had been driven in. Accordingly, the United States Department of the Navy assigned the crew of the battleship , or the wrecking vessel Henlopen, to strip her of her guns, supplies, and equipment for use on other ships. New Hampshires crew left Memphis without her guns, with much of her topside gear missing, and with her gun turrets rotated off the centerline.

Memphiss ship's bell was presented to a local church as a gesture of thanks to citizens of Santo Domingo who had helped to rescue the ship's crew.

Final disposition
Memphis was struck from the Naval Vessel Register on 17 December 1917 and sold to the A. H. Radetsky Iron and Metal Company of Denver, Colorado, on 17 January 1922 for scrapping for the sum of $3,000 (US$  in ). Scrapped on site, her wreck proved difficult to dismantle, and the last of it did not disappear from the Santo Domingo shoreline until 1938.

Her bronze bow scrollwork, removed approximately 1909, is on display on a concrete mockup of her bow in Nashville, Tennessee's Centennial Park.

References

Author not listed, "The Tennessee Accident." In "Service Items," The Navy (Washington DC: Navy Publishing Company), June 1908. Retrieved 18 April 2012.
Alden, John D. American Steel Navy: A Photographic History of the U.S. Navy from the Introduction of the Steel Hull in 1883 to the Cruise of the Great White Fleet. Annapolis, Maryland: Naval Institute Press, 1989. 
Beach, Edward L., Jr. The Wreck of the Memphis. New York, New York:  Holt, Rinear, and Wiston, 1966. Naval Institute Press Classics of Naval Literature 1998 re-print 
Friedman, Norman. U.S. Cruisers: An Illustrated Design History. Annapolis, Maryland: Naval Institute Press, 1984. 
Musicant, Ivan. U.S. Armored Cruisers: A Design and Operational History. Annapolis, Maryland: Naval Institute Press, 1985. 
Smith, Craig B. Extreme Waves.  Washington, D.C.: Joseph Henry Press, 2006. .

External links

USS Tennessee (Armored Cruiser # 10), 1906–1916. Renamed Memphis in May 1916

 

Tennessee-class cruisers
Ships built by William Cramp & Sons
1904 ships
Shipwrecks in the Caribbean Sea
Maritime incidents in 1916
Rogue wave incidents